Catholic Legal Immigration Network, Inc. (commonly referred to as CLINIC) is the US's largest network of non-profit immigration activist programs. In its 1986 pastoral statement "Together a New People", the United States Conference of Catholic Bishops (USCCB) observed that the church's ministry to immigrants reflects the "biblical understanding of the justice of God reaching out to all peoples and rectifying the situation of the poor, the orphans, the widows, the disadvantaged, and especially in the Old Testament, the alien and the stranger." Two years later, USCCB established CLINIC as a legally distinct 501(c)(3) non-profit organization to support a rapidly growing need for community-based programs dedicated to serve indigent and low-income immigrants. CLINIC's network originally comprised seventeen diocesan affiliates and has since increased to over 200 Catholic and community-based immigration programs with 290 field offices in 47 states, Washington, D.C., and Puerto Rico.  In addition, the network affiliates employ roughly 1,200 Board of Immigration Appeals (BIA) accredited attorneys who serve over 600,000 low-income immigrants each year. CLINIC affiliated agencies represent low-income immigrants without reference to their race, religion, gender, ethnic group, or other distinguishing characteristics.

Mission statement
"Embracing the Gospel value of welcoming the stranger, CLINIC promotes the dignity and protects the rights of immigrants in partnership with a dedicated network of Catholic and community legal immigration programs."

Programs
National Legal Center for Immigrants: The National Legal Center works to expand the availability of professional, low-cost immigration services by providing legal expertise, training and technical assistance to CLINIC's member agencies and constituents. Attorneys from the National Legal Center provide legal advice to more than 1,000 nonprofit, community-based immigration service providers through phone consultations, multi-day trainings, broadcast e-mails, and a variety of publications. Its success in delivering legal support to this expanding network has made CLINIC widely recognized as the most productive legal support group in the field.
Center for Citizenship and Immigrant Communities: The Center for Citizenship and Immigrant Communities strengthens immigrant rights community by preparing charitable immigration programs to expand their service-delivery capacity and establishing a coordinated service-delivery and legal support architecture. Through its various projects, the Center for Citizenship and Immigrant Communities seeks to develop capacity for lasting change by working with a cross-section of national and regional groups in under-served communities, (whether geographic, ethnic, or population-specific communities) to start or improve existing programs that will allow millions of immigrants throughout the United States to understand and to exercise their rights.
Center for Immigrant Rights: The Center for Immigrant Rights tackles problems faced by low-income immigrants and CLINIC member agencies that can only be resolved through advocacy, education, pro bono representation, litigation, and media. The Center identifies legal trends and issues affecting immigrants and pursues responsive solutions. The Center prioritizes its advocacy agenda in concert with its member agencies. It also collaborates with Migration and Refugee Services of the United States Conference of Catholic Bishops (USCCB). At the national level, the Center for Immigrant Rights focuses on administrative advocacy with officials at the Department of Homeland Security (DHS) and the Executive Office for Immigration Review (EOIR). At the local level, the Center supports the efforts of advocates working to combat state and local anti-immigrant measures. To increase representation to detained immigrants, the Center coordinates the Board of Immigration Appeals Pro Bono Project. Because documentation and media coverage of the human impact of U.S. immigration policies are crucial to advocacy efforts that seek to create a more just immigration system, the Center documents and facilitates media coverage of the challenges facing immigrants served by its network. It also provides support to its member and colleague agencies engaged in media outreach.
Center for Religious Immigration and Protection: As the number of foreign-born Catholics immigrating to the United States continues to steadily increase, the number of U.S. men and women entering the seminary or religious life continues to steadily decrease. In light of this reality, the Church is bringing foreign-born religious workers into the United States to address the growing need for spiritual and pastoral ministry to foreign-born and U.S. Catholics. The Center for Religious Immigration and Protection assists more than 250 archdiocese, dioceses and religious institutes to bring foreign-born religious workers to the U.S. for education, formation, or ministry. The Center offers a variety of legal and educational services that enable CLINIC to fulfill its mission to enhance, extend, and support the legal immigration work of the Catholic Church.

Board of directors
The Most Reverend Richard J. Garcia, D. D.
President, Bishop of Diocese of Monterey
Most Reverend Anthony Taylor
Vice President, Bishop of Little Rock
Sr. Sally Duffy, SC
Treasurer, President & Executive Director, SC Ministry Foundation, Inc.
Most Reverend Nicholas DiMarzio
Bishop of Brooklyn
Sr. RayMonda DuVall, CHS
Executive Director, Catholic Charities of San Diego
Most Reverend Eusebio Elizondo
Auxiliary Bishop of Seattle
Most Reverend José Gomez
Archbishop of Los Angeles
Ms. Marguerite (Peg) Harmon
Executive Director, Catholic Community Services of Southern Arizona
Mr. James T. McGibbon
Managing Director, O'Meara, Ferguson, Whelan and Conway
Most Reverend Eduardo A. Nevares
Auxiliary Bishop of Phoenix
Most Reverend Joseph A. Pepe
Bishop of Las Vegas
Mr. Vincent F. Pitta
Pitta & Gibblin LLP
Most Reverend Kevin W. Vann
Bishop of Fort Worth
Most Reverend Thomas G. Wenski
Archbishop of Miami
Ms. Nancy Wisdo
Associate General Secretary, USCCB
Mr. John Wilhelm
President - UNITE HERE
Ambassador Johnny Young
Executive Director, Migration & Refugee Services
Most Reverend Luiz Zarama
Auxiliary Bishop of Atlanta

References

External links 
 
 United States Conference of Catholic Bishops Homepage

Immigrant services organizations
1988 establishments in the United States
Immigration political advocacy groups in the United States
Immigrant rights organizations in the United States